"Spider-Man" is the name of multiple comic book superheroes from the Marvel Comics Multiverse. The original and most well known is Peter Parker created by Stan Lee and Steve Ditko originating from the Earth-616 universe. Within the mainstream Marvel Universe there have been characters that have taken the mantle such as Ben Reilly, Mac Gargan and Doctor Octopus.

Outside of the mainstream universe, there are different incarnations of Spider-Man in alternate universes. Popular examples include characters such as talking animal parodies like Spider-Ham, an alternate future version named Miguel O'Hara, a daughter of Peter Parker named Mayday Parker in the MC2 universe, a different take on Peter Parker in the Great Depression era, the Ultimate version of Peter Parker and his successor, Miles Morales, along with a variant of Spider-Man where Peter's supporting character, Gwen Stacy, becomes Spider-Woman instead of Parker. Originally, these characters were depicted as separate from each other, but they have crossed over together in storylines like "Spider-Verse", "Web Warriors", and Spider-Geddon, in teams such as Spider-Army and Web Warriors, where the many different versions of Spider-themed characters are the major protagonists of the storyline. Some of these characters appeared in Spider-Man: Into the Spider-Verse. Some of these characters were temporarily merged in the same universe in the 2015 comic book series Secret Wars as a part of the Spider-Man family.

There have been different version characters in other media that have crossed over in comics as well.

Prime Earth (Earth-616)

Peter Parker, the Spider-Man of Earth-616 is the original
Spider-Man of the character and appears in nearly every single piece of other media surrounding Spider-Man.

Other universes
Other related characters exist in alternative versions of the Marvel Universe called the Multiverse. These characters originally appeared in their own continuity but later on crossed over with the mainstream Spider-Man family. In 2015 all the alternate comic book universes were destroyed and only a few characters joined with Earth-616 characters in its own universe including various Spider-Men.

DC crossovers (Earth-7642)
In some intercompany crossovers with DC Comics, Spider-Man has worked alongside Superman twice, once to defeat Doctor Octopus and Lex Luthor and the other to stop Doctor Doom from providing the Parasite with long-term access to the powers of both the Hulk and Wonder Woman. He also worked alongside Batman to defeat Carnage and the Joker, the two later collaborating to defeat the Kingpin and Ra's al Ghul, with Fisk eventually aiding the heroes in the end.

Earth X (Earth-9997)

In the series Earth X and its sequels, in which its universe's Earth is designated as Earth-9997, Peter Parker's identity as Spider-Man is revealed and he is no longer a superhero. In time, he becomes overweight and resembles his late uncle as he ages. After the death of his wife, his daughter bonds to the Venom symbiote and fights crime, much to his dismay. During the course of the series, he becomes a police officer. Three other related characters appear.

In the same universe, an African American homeless man was mutated from the Terrigen Mist and his skin mutated into red reptilian skin with black lines. He can use his Energy Web to trap his victims in a trap of illusions. He went by the alias "Spiders Man".

A.I.M. Pocket Reality (Earth-13584)
On this Earth, Spider-Man underwent a further mutation that turned his skin blue, caused him to develop a spider-like language, and enabled him to make webs that have an effect on Iron Man's armors and Doctor Strange's magic, while emitting a smell that repels the monsters on the Thing's side. Using these webs, Spider-Man surrounded a section of Hell's Kitchen to act as his territory for him and his gang (consisting of Daredevil, Hawkeye, Shang-Chi, Iron Fist, Colleen Wing, and Misty Knight). The Dark Avengers had to make their way through Spider-Man's territory in order to rescue Moonstone and Skaar from Strangetown, which resulted in them running into Spider-Man's gang. After Spider-Man's gang subdues the Dark Avengers while thinking that they are knockoffs of the originals, Ai Apaec speaks with Spider-Man in their spider-like language, stating that they are good guys. Spider-Man releases them from their webs. The Dark Avengers and Spider-Man's gang arrive in Strangetown, where they fought the All-Seeing Eye and the Soulsnake that are on Doctor Strange's side. After the two creatures are killed, Spider-Man is killed by Tigra as Doctor Strange stated that his two creatures were sacrificed so that Spider-Man can be brought down.

Exiles
In the series Exiles, which involves inter-dimensional travel, several alternative versions appear:
 The Spider is an alternative version of Spider-Man who merged with the Carnage symbiote and became a psychopathic killer. Before being displaced in time, he had been on death row in his home reality. He originates from Earth-15 and was a member of Weapon X.
 A Spider-Man who is a member of the Fantastic Five and dies in a battle against the Spider.
 A Peter Parker who is part of a mutant superhero team, Force-X, led by Emma Frost. His codename is "Spider". His outfit is the standard Force-X uniform, he wears goggles instead of a mask, and his webbing is organic.
 A version of Peter Parker (from Earth-218) who is a child abused by his Uncle Ben. While locked in the cellar, he is befriended by a large spider-like creature, the Tallus, who instructs Blink and Nocturne to lead this universe's incarnation of Wolverine to the rundown shack the Parkers call home. A fight ensues and the creature and Wolverine are both slain. As Blink and Nocturne depart this reality, it is shown that the creature bit the young Peter.
 Morph fought a Demon Spider-Man on an alternative world. Later, the Demon Spider-Man was viewed briefly by Mojo and Major Domo as it attacked a young couple in a parking complex, but the Demon Spider-Man killed itself.

Heroes Reborn
In the Heroes Reborn event, a change in the timeline results in a continuity in which the Squadron Supreme are Earth's mightiest heroes while the Avengers never came to be. In this continuity, Peter isn't bitten by the radioactive spider due to Flash Thompson pushing him out of the way right before it happens. He achieves valedictorian in high school and later attends Empire University, but drops out after Aunt May dies in the crossfire of one of Hyperion's battles. He is hired by Robbie Robertson to take pictures of heroes and act as a friend to Hyperion (in a similar fashion to Jimmy Olsen's relationship with Superman in DC Comics). When Hyperion fails to eliminate all of General Annihhilus's hive, Peter successfully manages to evacuate the Bugle and destroy the remaining bug, but is bitten and transforms into a spider-like creature.

House of M (Earth-58163)
In House of M, a Marvel crossover event, the Scarlet Witch alters reality to make mutants the ruling class over humans. This world is ruled by mutants and their leader, Magneto. In the miniseries Spider-Man: House of M, Peter Parker is believed to be a mutant, and Spider-Man's identity is widely known. He is rich, famous and married to Gwen Stacy, and they have a young son named Ritchie. Aunt May and Uncle Ben are alive and in good health, and J. Jonah Jameson is Peter's often-abused publicist. Unfortunately, his life unravels when Jameson reveals to the world that Spider-Man is not a born mutant. After the world is restored to normal, Peter suffers terribly with the memory of the life he left behind, expressing a desire to kill Magneto, whom he mistakenly believes was behind the events of the House of M, and the Scarlet Witch, whose powers were responsible for the altered reality. This version is later killed by Karn during the "Spider-Verse" event.

The Manga (Earth-70091)

Spider-Man: The Manga is a Japanese manga illustrated by Ryoichi Ikegami which retold the story of Spider-Man in a Japanese setting. It was originally published in Japan from January 1970 to September 1971 in Monthly Shōnen Magazine. The main character is named  to maintain the Japanese adaptation.

Marvel Mangaverse (Earth-2301)

Marvel Adventures (Earth-20051)
This version of Spider-Man first appeared in Marvel Adventures Spider-Man #53-61 before appearing in the re-titled Spider-Man: Marvel Adventures comic book series. A modern-day high school student, this Spider-Man's origin is similar to his mainstream counterpart, but his supporting cast is significantly different. Although Gwen Stacy exists in this universe, she and Peter are not dating — instead Peter is dating a brand-new character named Sophia "Chat" Sanduval, who is a mutant with the ability to talk to animals. Peter's relationship with Gwen's father, Captain George Stacy, also differs from the original version — here, Captain Stacy discovers Peter's secret identity early on, yet rather than hide this information from Peter (as his mainstream counterpart did), he confides in Peter and becomes Spider-Man's unofficial police contact. While this Spider-Man battles supervillains, he is generally more concerned with combating street-level crime and focuses heavily on taking down the Torinos, a powerful New York City Mafia family.

MC2 (Earth-982)
An alternative version of Peter Parker also exists on Earth-982 aka the Marvel Comics 2 (MC2) universe, appearing as a supporting character in Spider-Girl.

The title follows almost the entire 616 timeline of the character up until the first attempt at a "relaunch" by the company, 1999, where it deviates and provides an alternative ending to the Final Chapter storyline. Peter's wayward daughter May is revealed to be alive and well, and is returned to both Parkers by Peter's first clone, the redeemed Kaine. Despite now being a father, Peter continues to fight crime as Spider-Man, and begins to cope with the new responsibilities brought by his baby daughter.

Two years later, during his final battle against the Green Goblin, rather than survive unscathed, Peter loses a leg to his arch-enemy and Osborn is killed. Peter finally realizes the price he has paid for being Spider-Man, and ends his career to raise a family with Mary Jane and May. Over the years, he overcomes his physical handicap and ultimately joins the NYPD in a scientific capacity. However, after saving him from an insane Normie Osborn, his daughter May "Mayday" Parker begins a career as Spider-Girl behind his back, a decision Peter begrudgingly is forced to accept and deal with, made difficult by his love for May.

Regardless of his handicap, Peter returned to the role of Spider-Man several times. Once was to aid his daughter and Darkdevil, the son of Ben Reilly, against Kaine, another to convince the latest Spider-Man (the son of Jessica Drew) to cease risking his life, and in Spider-Girl #100 to save May from the Hobgoblin. Peter and MJ ultimately have a second child, Benjamin "Benjy" Parker Jr., who is temporarily rendered deaf after possession by the Carnage symbiote and being blasted with high-frequency sonics. Benjy later develops powers of his own at an infant age. Peter was killed by Daemos, the brother of Morlun, during the "Spider-Verse" event while trying to protect Benjy and Mayday. Near the end of Spider-Geddon, the Other appears to resurrect him.

Spider-Girl

The Spider-Girl comic book series, originally published under the MC2 imprint, features May "Mayday" Parker, Peter's daughter in an alternative continuity. This timeline diverged from the regular continuity when Peter and Mary Jane's daughter is returned to them by Kaine. In Spider-Girl, Peter has been retired from crime fighting since his final battle with the Green Goblin, which cost him a leg. Peter has settled down to family life and works for the New York City Police Department as a forensic scientist. His teen daughter May follows in his footsteps against his wishes, but Peter eventually helps her train for her calling. Peter appears in costume several times in Spider-Girl, either to restrain and protect May, or to assist her. Peter is among the superheroes kidnapped by Loki in the spin-off series Last Hero Standing.

In the recent Spider-Girl storyline "Brand New May", Peter has uncovered a lab, within it is a stasis tank containing an exact physical symbiote duplicate of Mayday Parker, with notes left behind by Norman Osborn suggesting she is the real Mayday, and not a clone. When protecting his nephew Normie from an exploding test tube, Peter is affected by the serum within much like Osborn was...and begins to develop erratic behavior. He ultimately overcomes an attempt by Norman Osborn to control his mind and defeats him with the aid of his daughter, her clone, and the spirit of his Aunt May.

Spider-Man (Gerry Drew)

In the same MC2 continuity as Spider-Girl, Gerald "Gerry" Drew, the son of Jessica Drew, inherits spider-powers and poses as Spider-Man. Created by Tom DeFalco and Ron Frenz, he first appeared in Spider-Girl #32 (May 2001), and is a supporting character in Spider-Girl.

Within the context of the stories, Jessica Drew, the original Spider-Woman, had retired from superheroics and gotten married. She gives birth to a baby boy, Gerry, who was diagnosed with a strange blood-borne disorder due to radiation exposure in the womb. With doctors and medicines unable to help her son, Jessica recreates the experiment that cured her of her radiation poisoning, the experiment that made her Spider-Woman. The experiment imbues Gerry with spider-powers, but did not cure him. Gerry's illness strains his parents' marriage and leads to their divorce. Feeling responsible for the break-up, Gerry becomes withdrawn. Jessica tries to alleviate his pain by telling him stories from her past, his favorites involving Spider-Man.

Determined to make his short time on Earth count, Gerry designs his own Spider-Man costume and equipment based from his idol's, and convinces his mother to train him in how to use his powers. Calling himself Spider-Man, he meets Spider-Girl, and the two initially clash. During a fight between several villains, a bullet intended for Spider-Man kills one of the villains when Spider-Girl shoves him out of its way. Upset that he was responsible for a death, Gerry runs into Darkdevil, who trains him to be a more effective crime-fighter. At the request of Peter Parker, the original Spider-Man, Gerry decides to retire from superheroic adventuring, while Reed Richards searches for a cure for his blood disease.

Spider-Monkey (Earth-8101)
A spider monkey-themed Spider-Man appearing in Marvel Apes. The character was later killed by Jennix in the "Spider-Verse" event.

Marvel Nemesis: Rise of the Imperfects (Earth-50701)
In the Marvel Nemesis: Rise of the Imperfects series, set on Earth-50701, Spider-Man was abducted by an alien scientist named Doctor Niles Van Roekel. The Thing, Wolverine, Elektra, the Human Torch, and Storm are also abducted and injected with a drug in an attempt to corrupt them. Once infected, Spider-Man's costume is brown-and-bronze with a blue spider mark in his chest. Spider-Man and the other heroes are eventually able to fight off the corrupting infection and defeat Van Roekel. In the aftermath of the invasion, Paragon and the Imperfects join to share the Earth with the heroes.

Marvel Zombies Spider-Man (Earth-2149)

The Marvel Zombies universe features a Spider-Man who has been turned into a flesh-eating zombie after being infected by Colonel America (alternative reality of Zombified Captain America). Although Spider-Man is just as ravenous as the other zombies when hungry, when he has eaten, Spider-Man is racked with guilt at what he has done, especially for having eaten Mary Jane and Aunt May, but unable to change his nature. At the conclusion of the original series, Spider-Man is one of the heroes who become the Galacti, having consumed the original Galactus and subsequently acquiring his cosmic powers.

In Marvel Zombies 2, he notices that his hunger is starting to fade and, as a result, is the first of the Galacti to turn against his fellow zombies. Eventually with the aid of Forge, Malcom, and the Acolytes, the zombies retaining their hunger are defeated. Spider-Man is one of the zombies that remain and continues work to rebuild New Wakanda and bury the dead.

In Marvel Zombies Return Spider-Man is teleported to a new world, where he consumes and infects the Sinister Six (except for the Sandman). As his cosmic abilities did not come with him, and his web-shooters have dried up, the zombified superhero is forced to make do with his own veins and arteries. Following the death of the Spider-Man of this universe (mistakenly killed by the Sandman in revenge for the deaths of the other members of the Sinister Six) the zombie Spider-Man works on developing a cure for the plague with the aid of the Kitty Pryde of this universe, using nanites and the blood of this world's Wolverine. With the zombie Giant-Man having followed Spider-Man to this new reality, Spider-Man resolves to stop Giant-Man. Spider-Man releases the Sandman, now infused with nanites, and wipes out every zombie hero and villain. Zombie Spider-Man dies from being exposed to his own weapon.

Mutant X (Earth-1298)
The Mutant X version of Spider-Man diverges from his mainstream counterpart in Amazing Spider-Man #102, in that he was unable or unwilling to cure himself of having six arms. For unexplained reasons, he reverses his name to the Man-Spider. A third divergence occurs when he and his clone continue to co-exist after the end of the original Clone Saga. The two keep this a secret by taking care to never appear in public at the same time, but the Man-Spider is forced to admit the truth after his clone is killed by Madelyne Pryor. He himself is later killed.

Newspaper strip (Earth-77013)
The Peter Parker of the daily Spider-Man newspaper strip continues his career as a struggling photographer constantly facing down the abuse of his less-than-satisfied boss J. Jonah Jameson, whilst battling crime in his disguise as Spider-Man. In addition to opposing classic enemies, much of the strip sees Peter battle new enemies. He has also teamed up with various heroes through the strip's run, such as Daredevil and Wolverine. He is married to Mary Jane in this continuity, and has often been aided by her in his battles with his enemies. This universe was visited by Morlun during the "Spider-Verse" event, but due to time distortions constantly resetting things so that the simplest actions take weeks to progress, Morlun finds his efforts to consume this version of Peter fruitless. The Master Weaver of the Inheritors elects to rebel against his masters for once and seals this universe away in a pocket dimension, where it will remain safe from any further attacks.

Powerless (Earth-40081)
Marvel published a miniseries called Powerless in 2004, which describes a Marvel Universe without superpowers. In this series, Peter Parker appears as a young man nicknamed Spider-Man on the Internet. This version had also been bitten by a radioactive spider, but instead of gaining spider-powers, his hand became atrophic. In this continuity, Peter is in love with Gwen Stacy; Mary Jane is not featured.

Ruins Spider-Man (Earth-9591)
Warren Ellis' parody of Kurt Busiek's Marvels, Ruins, was a two-part miniseries set in an alternative universe where the situations that led to the heroes of the Marvel Universe gaining superpowers led to horrific deformities and deaths instead. In this world, when Parker was bitten by a radioactive spider, instead of gaining spider-powers, he broke out into an infectious rash that covered his body before his painful death. He had visited the offices of the Daily Bugle beforehand and infected fellow photographer Phil Sheldon, who set off to figure out how his world took a wrong turn, but succumbed to the disease before he could write his book.

Spectacular Spider-Man Adventures (Earth-9411)

The United Kingdom-based Panini Comics publication Spectacular Spider-Man Adventures was loosely based on the continuity of the 1994 animated TV series. In this series, Peter Parker deals with the day-to-day headaches of balancing a social life with his superheroics. He has a close circle of friends such as Liz Allen, Harry Osborn, and Flash Thompson, and he is involved in a relationship with Mary Jane. However, in this continuity, Mary Jane does not possess an existing knowledge of his dual identity, and thus Peter finds juggling his life with her and his crime-fighting career difficult. Despite this, Mary Jane loyally supports Peter, believing it is his dangerous job as a photographer that keeps him away from dates and other activities. A look into the future reveals Peter and MJ ultimately get married in this continuity and have a daughter, May, who is active as Spider-Girl. At some point in this future, Peter loses his leg, which forces him to retire as Spider-Man.

Spider-Woman (Earth-807128)

In the Old Man Logan universe, the granddaughter of Peter Parker and daughter of Clint Barton and Tonya Parker, the supervillain known as Spider-Woman was born Ashley, seemingly lacking spider-powers yet using her intuition and combat training to conquer a portion of the Wastelands as the new Kingpin.

Spider-Boy (Earth-9602)
In the Amalgam Comics universe, Spider-Man was combined with DC's Superboy to create Spider-Boy. He is featured in Spider-Boy #1 (April 1996) and Spider-Boy Team-Up #1 (June 1997). In this continuity, Spider-Boy is the clone of researcher Peter Parker, created during an explosion in the Project Cadmus Labs. Adopted by Cadmus director General Thunderbolt Ross, he is given the name "Pete Ross". Spider-Boy's power is the ability to redirect his own personal gravity, giving him the ability to climb walls, and to increase his strength. He is able to shoot webs using a special "web gun" developed by Cadmus. Spider-Boy is an honorary member of the Legion of Galactic Guardians 2099 (an amalgamation of DC's Legion of Super-Heroes and Marvel's Guardians of the Galaxy plus the Marvel 2099 timeline). In the Spider-Verse miniseries, he is seen in the background during a fight with the Inheritors.

Spider-Ham (Earth-8311)

Spider-Hulk (Earth-70105)
In Bullet Points, Peter Parker is the Hulk and Bruce Banner is Spider-Man. Peter is killed by Galactus, and Bruce is killed by Daemos during the "Spider-Verse" event while trying to extract Kaine from Earth-616.

Spider-Man 1602 (Earth-311)
Peter Parquagh is a counterpart to Peter in the miniseries Marvel 1602, albeit without spider-powers. In the series he acts as an apprentice to the royal spymaster Sir Nicholas Fury. A running gag involves Peter repeatedly almost getting bitten by unusual spiders, something that finally occurs at the very end. In the sequel miniseries, 1602: New World, he takes the identity of the Spider. Later, Peter's dual identity is revealed, and with the death of his beloved Virginia Dare at the hands of Norman Osborne, he returns to Europe and falls in love with Marion Jane Watson and joins her family of theater performers. During a battle with Baron Octavius, Norman Osborn, and Curtis Connors in Venice, a bystander picks up some of Peter's webbing, which eventually served as the basis for the Super Soldier Serum and created Captain America in World War II in this universe. While in the Globe Theatre, he is attacked and killed by the supervillain Morlun.

Spider-Man 1602 appears in Spider-Man: Shattered Dimensions as an alternative costume for Spider-Man Noir, and in Edge of Time as a costume for Miguel O'Hara.

Spider-Man 2099 (Earth-928)

A geneticist named Miguel O'Hara gained his spider-powers from a gene splicing incident, when the company he was about to quit injected him with a dangerous drug called Rapture. He tried to rid himself of the drug by using the gene splicer he helped to invent but, unbeknownst to him, a jealous co-worker had set it to repeat the previous experiment of a spider. The last time they had tried this experiment, it killed the test subject (the main reason Miguel O'Hara quit), but this time it worked. Instead of becoming a company-owned version of Spider-Man he became the opposite, a Spider-Man to fight Alchemax and the other large corporations ruling the world in 2099. He now fights crime as the Spider-Man of 2099.

Spider-Man 2211 (Earth-9500)

Spider-Man (Max Borne), also known as Spider-Man 2211, is a superhero who appears in comics published by Marvel Comics. Created by Peter David and Rick Leonardi, he first appeared in Spider-Man 2099 Meets Spider-Man (Nov. 1995).
Picture: Spider-Man 2211
Within the context of the stories, Dr. Max Borne is from the year 2211, the Spider-Man of that year. In his first appearance he aids two other Spider-Men, Peter Parker and Miguel O'Hara, in defeating the Hobgoblin 2211, his main enemy. This version of the Hobgoblin is Robin Borne, his daughter, driven insane when she was infected by a nanovirus. Spider-Man 2211 is later shot and killed by the Chameleon of the year 2211 posing as Uncle Ben.

Spider-Man: Chapter One (Earth-98121)
The miniseries Spider-Man: Chapter One was John Byrne's attempt to re-imagine Spider-Man's early years (similar to the revamp given to Superman), giving him a new but similar origin. The series is no longer considered canon within the Earth-616 universe, but is instead set in its own.

Spider-Man Fairy Tales
 Kwuka Anansi (Earth-7082), A playful trickster god based on the West African mythological figure of the same name. He is also featured in the "Spider-Verse" event.
 Izumi (Earth-7930), a Japanese boy who is bitten by a Tsuchigumo version of Venom and transforms into Spider-Man.
 The Prince of Aracne (Earth-71004), a knight version of Peter Parker in an altered retelling of Cinderella. He is killed by Solus in the "Spider-Verse" event.

Spider-Manga (Earth-7041)

This is one of many manga-related Spider-Man series. The character later crossed over into the "Spider-Verse" event with the Marvel Mangaverse version and The Manga version.

Mary Jane Spider-Man (Earth-602636)

Spider-Man (India) (Earth-50101)

Spider-Man Noir (Earth-90214)

This version of Spider-Man appeared in a four-issue miniseries (February–May 2009) set in the Great Depression Era of New York in the 1930s. Aunt May is a speaker for equality and spends time standing on a soap box shouting out her beliefs. Uncle Ben was killed by a crime syndicate run by Norman Osborn, a.k.a. the Goblin. Shortly afterward, Peter is bitten by a strange spider and endowed with mystical spider-powers. He has a wall-crawling ability, increased agility, strength, and a form of spider-sense, and can spray nets of webbing from his hand. He dons a black mask, gloves, and a trench coat, and sets out to stop Norman and his gang. In Spider-Geddon, he is killed by Morlun only to be resurrected by the totem that gave him his powers later in the story.

This version of Spider-Man appears in the game Spider-Man: Shattered Dimensions and has made further appearances in the Ultimate Spider-Man animated series and Spider-Man: Into the Spider-Verse.

Spider-Man: Last Stand (Earth-312500)
In issue #500 of The Amazing Spider-Man, Julia Carpenter, now possessing Madame Web's powers, shows what would happen if Spider-Man were to have proceeded in killing Kraven the Hunter. In the vision, Peter is kicked out of the Avengers for his killing of the Kravinoffs. He develops a much colder and harsher personality and attacks Harry Osborn. He then appears in a new red leather costume and starts killing all of the supervillains, beginning with Doctor Octopus, and reveals his identity to his Aunt May, who is shocked and in tears.

Spider-Man: Life Story (Earth-19529)
The 2019 six-issue miniseries Spider-Man: Life Story, written by Steve Murray/Chip Zdarsky, features a version of Peter Parker/Spider-Man that began his superhero career in his debut date of 1962 and ages in real time, witnessing key events such as the Vietnam War (which lasted longer in this reality), the Russian War (a fictional World War III-esque conflict between the United States and the Soviet Union) and 9/11, as well as marrying Mary Jane Watson and this reality's versions of Secret Wars, Kraven's Last Hunt, The Clone Saga and Civil War. By the final issue, Spider-Man sacrifices himself to stop Doctor Doom.

Spider-Man: Reign (Earth-70237)
Spider-Man: Reign depicts an older Spider-Man in the future who, having given up on crime-fighting, is driven back into action by the return of some of his old enemies, exposing a conspiracy by Venom to take control of the city with a mass of symbiotes. The character is later killed by Daemos with his head smashed on Mary Jane Watson's tombstone in the "Spider-Verse" event.

Spider-Man Unlimited
This version of Spider-Man, after being blamed by J. Jonah Jameson for his son's disappearance exploring another planet named Counter-Earth, designs a new costume with sonic weaponry and stealth capabilities using nanotechnology borrowed from Reed Richards. Traveling to Counter-Earth himself, he joins a group of human revolutionaries led by John Jameson himself in resisting the High Evolutionary and his tyrannical rule, in which humans are brutally oppressed and the half-human, half-animal Beastials form the social elite. He also battles Venom and Carnage, who traveled with Jameson to Counter-Earth and are plotting to infect the entire planet with symbiotes. He is killed by Daemos of the Inheritors, along with the Knights of Wundagore and many other Beastials.

Spidey-Man (Earth-665)
This is a satirical version of the mainstream Spider-Man in Not Brand Echh.

Ultimate Marvel (Earth-1610)

Ultimate Peter Parker
Ultimate Spider-Man is a modernized reboot of the Spider-Man story, starting from the very beginning, with a plot that is inspired by, but very different from, the original 616 continuity and thus is a parallel universe counterpart to the mainstream version of Spider-Man. The main purpose of the series is to be accessible to new and young readers, as it is free from the decades of history of the original, but it has been embraced by many longtime fans as well.

The Spider
In the ongoing series Ultimate Comics: Avengers, a second Spider-Man was shown to be one of its members, and is simply referred to as the Spider. His costume bears an orange-and-purple color as opposed to red-and-blue. The Spider once claimed that he was a clone made from the DNA of Spider-Man and Professor X that was sent from the future.

The Spider was seen as a member of the Avengers that was established by Nick Fury and Gregory Stark. Where he resided was kept under surveillance indicating that he might've been a criminal in his early life. Spider was said to be crazy where he caused a technician to commit suicide, but is shown to be intelligent as he enjoyed reading books. Gregory Stark referred to Spider as an "It" due to what his true nature would be.

Spider accompanied the Avengers in a manhunt on Ghost Rider where he was targeting then-Vice President of the United States Robert Blackthorn.

In the "Death of Spider-Man" story arc in Avengers vs. New Ultimates, he is revealed to be of an unidentified North Asian culture and acting under the orders of Gregory Stark who ordered him to lead a superhuman uprising in North Korea. The New Ultimate and the Hulk Drug-empowered Avengers arrived to quell the uprising. During the events of said uprising, the Spider was killed by Hawkeye after the Avengers and the New Ultimates intervened.

Miles Morales
After Peter Parker's apparent death in Ultimate Comics Spider-Man #160, a new character by the name of Miles Morales takes up the mantle of Spider-Man as a 13-year-old superhero.

The Webslinger

On the sword and sorcery alternate Earth called Eurth, the Webslinger is an alternate version of Spider-Man that helps Captain Avalon rescue his son from the Dreadlord.

What If?

 Alternative versions of Spider-Man appear in several issues of What If..?. In one major alternative universe, Spider-Man joins the Fantastic Four; this universe is revisited in several different issues of What If..? During the "Spider-Verse" event, this universe's versions of Reed, Ben, Johnny, and Peter are all killed by Karn.
 What if Spider-Man Had Kept His Six Arms? explores what would have happened if Morbius the Living Vampire had been eaten by sharks and thus never made it to Connors' laboratory with a cure. Ultimately the arm mutation is irreversible, but it proves an advantage and Spider-Man defeats most of his villains easily. Spider-Man even becomes a spokesman for the physically challenged, and inspires all to rise to their true potential. This Spider-Man appears in Spider-Verse and is killed by Daemos.
 What if someone else besides Spider-Man had been bitten by the radioactive spider? explores what would have happened if either Flash Thompson, Betty Brant or John Jameson were bitten by the radioactive spider. All three prove to be failures as the 'new' Spider-Man. Each story ends with Peter extracting the residual radioactive venom from the dead spider and using it to create a serum to give himself powers, thus becoming Spider-Man anyway. Versions of all three appear in the "Spider-Verse" event, where John is the only one that is not killed by the Inheritors.
 What if Spider-Man had never become a crimefighter? explores a world where Spider-Man stopped the burglar from robbing the TV studio and continued his TV career, becoming a public relations 'specialist' for superheroes until Jameson's angry attack on him when slacking off with his powers nearly results in Daredevil's death, inspiring Spider-Man to become a real hero. This version of Spider-Man is seen in the "Spider-Verse" event and apparently survived.
 What if the alien costume had possessed Spider-Man? sees Spider-Man being killed when he fails to go to Reed Richards for help in time to remove the symbiote, which goes on to drain the Hulk's powers and possess Thor until it is driven away by Black Bolt.
 In another issue named What if Captain America Were Not Revived Until Today?, Spider-Man joins an underground rebellion to fight an America turned fascist, aids the real Captain America in defeating the instigator behind this movement, and leading the chastised nation back to its democratic roots.
 What if? The Other, set during "The Other" storyline, features an alternative version of Peter who abandons the Spider when given the choice. Some time afterward, the Venom symbiote leaves its current host (Mac Gargan) and merges with Peter to become Poison.
 Another "What if?" universe has a version of Spider-Man who works side by side with his Uncle Ben to fight crime after his Aunt May is killed.
 Another issue portrays a Peter Parker whom the radioactive spider bite mutated into a spider-like creature, as well as making his son a mutant.
 In a "What if?" Age of Apocalypse reality in which both Charles Xavier and Eric Lensherr were killed, Apocalypse is served by clones of a symbiote Spider-Man, although the clones seem to be more symbiote than man.
 In What If? Spider-Man vs. Wolverine, Spider-Man goes to Russia with Wolverine on a rescue mission and eventually becomes a black-ops version. Through training alongside Wolverine, he enhances his spider-sense and becomes more confident. He eventually decides to join up with Wolverine permanently and leave behind his old ways. He also develops a change to his web-shooters which enables him to shoot bullets out of them, which he does, killing a man. He is shown in a sleeker black and red suit more fit for his new lifestyle. This Spider-Man appears in the "Spider-Verse" event as the "Assassin Spider-Man" and is killed by Daemos.
 In What If? Flash Thompson became Spider-Man, another version of Flash who became Spider-Man appears and is both a ruthless hero and still a bully to Peter who takes photos of Spider-Man, not knowing that he is Flash. When Peter finds out Flash's identity, he asks him to help save his aunt, but Flash furiously beats him to death. Flash, wanting revenge against Doctor Octopus, fights him but he gets trapped under rubble similar to the 616 Peter. While trying to lift off the rubble, he realizes that he is a murderer and, after freeing himself, willingly surrenders to the police.
 In What If? Spider-Man became the Punisher, Peter wears a black costume with a skull on it and converts his web shooters to fire bullets. Despite killing criminals, his life is similar to his 616 counterpart. When the Green Goblin kidnaps Gwen Stacy, Peter kills Norman and succeeds in saving Gwen. Peter decided to abandon the "Spider-Punisher" costume and live a normal life, then a wounded Frank Castle, who saw his family die to mobsters, finds the Spider-Punisher suit.
 What If... Set Had Come to Earth? features a version of Spider-Man who had been turned into one of Set's Serpent Men. He was later killed.

Secret Wars
A number of alternate versions of Spider-Man appear in the Battleworld domains as seen in the Secret Wars:

 In the Armor Wars reality, Peter Urich is a nephew of Ben Urich who became Spyder-Man after being infected with the "spider virus". He was dating Kiri Oshiro, the daughter of Rumiko Fujikawa. Spyder-Man was killed by Technopolis' baron Iron Man after he discovered vital information about the disease that forced everyone in Technopolis to wear armor.
 In an alternate Civil War reality where the conflict continued after the anti-registration side's attempt to escape the Negative Zone prison triggered a self-destruct sequence that destroyed most of New York, Peter continued serving on Captain America's side in the conflict and was given new upgrades such as wings that bear a resemblance to the Falcon; with Rogers noting that Peter is now his fastest operative. Since Mary-Jane and his daughter Maybelle live on Iron Man's terrain due to them not getting the chance to evacuate, he hardly gets the chance to see them. Following Steve's death in the final battle, Peter becomes the leader of Steve's side called "the Blue" and collaborates with Jennifer Walters, the new leader of "the Iron."
 In an alternate version of Spider-Island, Spider-Man was supposedly killed by the spider-infected Avengers, which inspired Agent Venom to lead the resistance. However, he is discovered to be still alive and being held captive in the Spider Queen's facility. He aids Flash in stopping the Spider Queen and becomes the Baron of Spider-Island after she is defeated; though at the cost of Flash's life.
 A story titled Amazing Spider-Man: Renew Your Vows sees Spider-Man and Mary Jane married with a daughter named Annie (who is developing spider-powers of her own). After being glimpsed in the "Spider-Verse" event, Peter saves his family from Venom while most of the heroes die by Regent's hands. He retires as Spider-Man to avoid detection from Regent and to focus on raising his family. However, he is later forced to don the mask again to stop Regent and protect his family. The second volume of the series details the later adventures of Spider-Man and his family.
A reality is seen depicting Spider-Man sacrificing himself to save the Prowler, who went on to continue the web-slinger's legacy as Spider-Hero.

No More (Earth-51838)
In No More — a story arc starting in Peter Parker: The Spectacular Spider-Man #303 - a trip to the past to retrieve vital information resulted in Peter Parker changing his past when his younger self decided to abandon being Spider-Man because he felt, based on what he had seen and overheard of his future self's life, that such a career would only bring him pain and suffering. As a result, Peter Parker became a successful industrialist married to Gwen Stacy, but Norman Osborn has conquered the world, killing Iron Man and most of the Fantastic Four and imprisoning Doctor Doom, with Peter still hiding behind his corporate role even as Gwen discreetly aids the resistance as he believes that taking action as Spider-Man will only make things worse.

The "Perfect" World (Earth-11638)

This version of Spider-Man is called the Amazing Spider, who is rich, powerful, and popular in a world where none of his loved ones have died. Peter runs Parker Technologies and his Uncle Ben spurs him to be the best. Upon inventing a portal technology, he unknowingly brought Earth-616's Spider-Man, Deadpool, and the Hulk to Earth-11638. During a scuffle with Spider-Man in the Amazing Spider's lair called the Web, Uncle Ben was about to plug Spider-Man into the machine. The Amazing Spider was caught between the machine and was placed in a comatose state. While in a coma, the Amazing Spider's soul arrived in Hell, where Bruce Banner's Sorcerer Supreme counterpart died fighting the Infernal Hulk, though Bruce's astral form stayed alive and helped return the Amazing Spider to life with the souls of the repentant damned, which gave him a second chance to live. When he awoke, he found himself transformed into a new character called the Ghost Spider. To make amends with Spider-Man, the Ghost Spider transported him, Deadpool, and the Hulk back to Earth-616.

Marvel vs. Capcom (Earth-30847)
Not much of this version of Spider-Man is different from traditional iterations, except for the fact that the universe is shared by Capcom characters. This universe does not have a concrete lore, but the main plot of Marvel vs. Capcom does feature Spider-Man contributing in the battle against Ultron Sigma, a fusion of Ultron and Sigma from the Mega Man X series.

Marvel 2 in One
When traveling through the multiverse, the Thing and the Human Torch get stranded in a universe with an apocalyptic Earth. This Earth is ruled by an evil version of Spider-Man who is wearing Captain America's mask.

Marvel: NOW WHAT! (Earth-231013)
In this universe, Spider-Storm (an amalgamation of Spider-Man and X-Men member Storm) appears as a member of the X-Vengers.

Infinity Warps
Peter Parker (with Moon Knight's story with elements of Spider-Man's life) was attacked by the Goblin by Night, who killed his Uncle Ben and Aunt May. Near death, he is revived from the Master Weaver by a spider to be his avatar and is given spider-powers, but splitting his personality into four. With his newfound powers, he fights crime under the name of the ArachKnight and is CEO of his company, along with Harry Russell and Merly Jane. He soon learns the truth from Harry that Norman had been cursed into a Goblin and killed both Ben and May against his will. When the Goblin curse took control of Norman's body the final time and passes the curse into Harry against his will, ArachKnight forgives a now cured Norman and welcomes him to join Parker Industries to help find a cure for Harry.

Venomverse (Earth-17952)
In the Venomverse event, an alternate version of Spider-Man who reunited with the symbiote after leaving Eddie Brock is recruited with the other Venoms to fight the Poisons. He is later tricked by a Poison into thinking it was Aunt May before it consumed him and became an enemy to Venom. He was later blown up with the other Poisons by a bomb created by a Venomized Rocket Raccoon.

Hasbro released an action figure of Poison in the Marvel Legends line.

Punisher vs. the Marvel Universe (Earth-11080)
After being the first to be infected by a virus that turned people into cannibals, Spider-Man ate the Rhino and took control of a piece of New York alongside the Black Widow, Deadpool, and Scorpio. After becoming Patient Zero, he hires Frank Castle to rescue a pregnant Mary Jane from the Kingpin's group. Frank did exactly that, but he later kills Patient Zero.

LEGO Marvel Super Heroes (Earth-13122)
In this universe, Spider-Man is a LEGO mini-figure with a more funny personality in Lego Marvel Super Heroes.

Spider-Man/Deadpool (Earth-18236)
In an alternate future, Spider-Man is an old man who got paralyzed from a Life Model Decoy Deadpool and lives in a retirement home with an elderly Wade Wilson. Unknown to Spider-Man, Oldpool was giving his blood to Peter so he would not die. In a battle between LMD Deadpools, Oldpool uses Doctor Doom's time machine and mistakenly switches places with the mainstream Deadpool. After they get to the main timeline, they are reunited with the mainstream Spider-Man and Oldpool, then, after stopping the Master Matrix (the LMD master created from Peter's parents) and the Chameleon, Old Man Peter and Oldpool fade away and go back to their timeline.

Squadron Supreme (Earth-31916)
In the Squadron Supreme series, Nell Ruggles (a.k.a. Arachnophilia) was a young troubled girl who, upon gaining her spider-powers, killed her classmates, who had bullied her in the past. However, her superhuman powers allowed her to be traced back to a device which the Icarus One astronauts brought back from the Moon. Running away from home, she was captured by the Blur and turned over to Nick Fury's S.H.I.E.L.D. Thanks to an electroshock collar, she has been prevented from leaving, although she appears to be making the best of the situation, having made friends and eventually falling in love with Tucker Ford, the Biogeneral.

Spider-Man (2019)
In the comic book series written by filmmaker J. J. Abrams and his son Henry, Peter Parker has retired his Spider-Man persona for twelve years following a battle with the monster Cadaverous who seemingly killed his wife Mary Jane Watson and mauled his right arm, forcing him to use a hook there instead. As a result, he is always away at work as a war photographer for the Daily Bugle per his own request to deal with his trauma and has a strained relationship with his son, Benjamin "Benny" Parker, who had inherited his father's powers and abilities and resents him for leaving him and Aunt May while also feeling like a monster. After Benny gets detention again for inadvertently using his powers to help save a fellow student from a bully, Peter reprimands him by telling him that it is not always good to try and help and that he should stay away because of his powers, only for his son to rebuke him. After Benny burns his father's original costume, he is soon convinced by his classmate and fellow detention student, Faye Ito a.k.a Marker to join her for a night out, and Aunt May gives him a spare costume. After Ben saves some lives, he catches his father's attention and the latter again rebukes him for trying to be a hero, despite May's own attempts to reprimand her nephew for not being a father to his son. After Peter is captured by Cadaverous who wants his DNA to resurrect his dead wife. Benny, regretting the way he treated his father teams up with Marker, Riri Williams and an aging Tony Stark, who lost his teammates, the Avengers to Cadaverous to help save his father. MJ is eventually revealed to be alive disguised as Cadaverous' minion and helps save Peter. Peter eventually sacrifices himself to save MJ and Benny and a funeral is held for him following which Tony Stark gives MJ and Benny, new Spider-Man based costumes via Aunt May.

Spider-Man: Spider's Shadow
This five-part series offers an alternate take on what would happen if Peter chose to keep the symbiote costume rather than reject it after Reed Richards revealed it was alive. Spider-Man starts acting more aggressive, even unmasking and threatening Hobgoblin (Roderick Kingsley) during an altercation. This leads Kingsley to track him down to May's house, where he blows it up and kills May in the process. Enraged, Peter brutally murders Hobgoblin and decides to take justice into his own hands by killing any criminals that come in his way. After Spider-Man seemingly kills the Kingpin, the Sinister Six (consisting of Kraven, Electro, Rhino, Mysterio, Eddie Brock possessing Doctor Octopus' arms and a reluctant J. Jonah Jameson) assemble in the countryside to take him down. Though Spider-Man kills Electro, Rhino, and Mysterio, Kraven and Jameson separate Peter from the symbiote after discovering its weakness to fire.

Jameson takes Peter home and to meet up with Mary Jane and Black Cat, where they find out that Kingpin had leaked Spider-Man's secret identity to the press. As Felicia takes Jameson to safety, Peter and Mary Jane discover that the symbiote has possessed Reed and taken over the Baxter Building, where it has used his scientific knowledge to make itself stronger and take control of anyone inside, including the Thing. Knowing the suit still wants him, Peter ventures into the building with Mary Jane and the Human Torch, where they find out that the symbiote used Reed to create other symbiotes to possess the other heroes present near the building. It then orders them to attack Mary Jane, as Peter's love for her is what prevented it from taking over him completely. Spider-Man and the Torch then lure the symbiote back to the Baxter Building, where Peter offers himself to the symbiote willingly. After the symbiote kills Reed, it attempts to bond to Peter again, however it's revealed that "Peter" was actually a disguised Torch using Reed's image inducer that the real Peter gave him, allowing him to annihilate the symbiote with his flames. Peter turned himself in for the murders, but was ultimately declared not guilty since the other heroes who were possessed by symbiotes testified on his behalf. He didn't know what to do since his secret identity had been ousted until Susan Storm invites Peter to join the Fantastic Four to take Reed's place.

Characters introduced in Spider-Verse

In the "Spider-Verse" event, a multitude of new Spider-Men (and women) from throughout the multiverse are revealed.

Spider-UK (Earth-833)

Billy Braddock a.k.a. Spider-UK, a British-based version of Spider-Man and a member of the Captain Britain Corps. He became a sole survivor from his universe after his home reality was destroyed during Time Runs Out and chose to remain in the reality of the defeated Inheritors, along with Anya Corazon. During Spider-Verse vol. 2, set during the Secret Wars event, Spider-UK and Anya Corazon found themselves in the domain of the Battleworld called Arachnia with no memories of how they got there and eventually teamed up with Spider-Gwen, Spider-Ham, Spider-Man Noir, and Spider-Man: India, neither of them remembering their previous encounter during the original "Spider-Verse" event. Following the conclusion of Secret Wars, the team of six Spiders will rename itself and be featured in a new ongoing series called Web Warriors, a name that was coined by Peter Parker from the Ultimate Spider-Man TV series during the original "Spider-Verse" event. During Spider-Geddon, when the Inheritors came back, Verna snapped Spider-UK's neck, killing him.

Spider-Gwen (Earth-65)

An alternative teenage version of Gwen Stacy who was bitten by the radioactive spider instead of Peter. On this Earth, Peter Parker's anger at being bullied results in him transforming himself into the Lizard. When he dies due to the chemicals he used in the transformation, Gwen is inspired to use her powers to help others.

Dr. Aaron "Spider-Man" Aikman (Earth-31411)
Dr. Aaron Aikman is a young scientist who fights crime as "the Spider-Man", using a gadget-laden suit of high tech body armor. He is supposedly killed by Morlun.

Patton Parnell (Earth-51412)
Patton Parnell is a disturbed, bullied teenager who, upon being bitten by a radioactive spider, becomes a twisted, bloodthirsty variant of Spider-Man/the Man-Spider and is subsequently killed by Morlun.

SP//dr (Earth-14512)

Spider-Wolf (Earth-13989)
Spider-Wolf is a werewolf version of Spider-Man who is killed by Karn.

Spider Moon-Man (Earth-449)
Spider Moon-Man is a version of Spider-Man from a universe where humans have successfully colonized the Moon. He is killed by Morlun.

"Golden Sponge Cakes" Hostess Spider-Man (Earth-51914)
The "Golden Sponge Cakes" Spider-Man is a parody of the version of Spider-Man that appeared in Hostess Cakes advertisements during the 1970s and 1980s. He uses Hostess’s Twinkies, Chocolate Cakes, Fruit Pies and Golden Sponge Cakes to defeat villains in his universe. He is killed by Morlun while going to a date with his Mary Jane.

Old Man Spider (Earth-4)
Old Man Spider is Ezekiel Sims. He took the Spider-Man mantle after his reality's Peter Parker was killed by Morlun. He died during the Spiders' clash with the Inheritors, but was able to warn the Spider-Man of Earth-616 to protect the "Other" and the "Bride".

Cosmic Spider-Man (Earth-13)
The Cosmic Spider-Man is a version of Spider-Man who retained the powers of the Enigma Force following its possession of him. The side effect is that his abilities will only work on his Earth. He is killed by Solus.

Cyborg Spider-Man (Earth-2818)
The Cyborg Spider-Man is introduced during the Spiders' battle with Karn, where the origin of his implants are never explained. He is destroyed at the hands of Daemos.

Lady Spider (Earth-803)
Lady Spider is May Reilly. Her father keeps a large number of animals in his study and when she is bitten by a spider she tries to pet, she realizes that, like the spider, she too is caged. Lady Spider does not have spider-powers, but instead uses a steampunk set of mechanical spider legs.

Man-Spider (Earth-15011)
In this alternate reality, the Man-Spider is Peter Parker who has an allergic reaction to the bite of the radioactive spider and is hospitalized. Because both Uncle Ben and Aunt May are at Peter's side in the hospital when their house is broken into, Ben is not killed by the burglar as in the 616 timeline. He is discovered by the Six-Armed Spider-Man and Spider-Man Noir, who cure him of his spider-powers.

Spider-Punk (Earth-138)

Spider-Punk (a.k.a. the Anarchic Spider-Man) is an African-American punk rocker named Hobart Brown who joins the Spiders' battle with the Inheritors. On his own world, he helped lead a populist revolution against the corrupt President Norman Osborn and his Venom-enhanced police force.

Spider-Girl (Earth-11)
Spider-Girl is an 11-year-old girl named Penelope Parker who gains spider powers after being bitten by a radioactive spider. She dons a homemade costume and becomes Spider-Girl, despite viewing her new powers as "gross".

Hobgoblin (Peter Parker) (Earth-21205)
After Earth-21205s version of Gwen Stacy died, an enraged Peter murdered the Green Goblin and becomes this universe's version of the Hobgoblin. Spider-Woman (Gwen Stacy) attempts to recruit him while on the run from the Inheritor Verna. He dies saving Gwen from Verna.

Arácnido Jr. (Earth-15349)
In an unidentified alternate reality, Arácnido Jr. is the son of a luchador who died after being betrayed by his tag team partner. This version of Spider-Man protects the streets of Mexico City and wears a costume inspired by that of his father.

Spider-Ma'am (Earth-3123)
On this universe, Aunt May was bitten by the radioactive spider instead of Peter, and takes the identity of Spider-Ma'am. She and her family are confronted by Karn. Sensing that he is too strong for her, she proposes to offer her life for the sake of her family, causing Karn to hesitate for a moment (because she reminded him of his mother). Before Karn tries to kill her, the other Spider Totems intervene and convince him to join them in their fight against the Inheritors.

Gagamboy Verse

Gagamboy was bitten by mutated spider that causes Gagamboy to gain his superpowers.
Junie (Navarro), is an ice cream vendor, who sells ice cream to children and adults alike. After his shift, he is in a predicament with a rival vendor, Dodoy (Jay Manalo). Their manager, angered by their actions, demotes Junie to a warehouse guard. Dodoy celebrates, only to be demoted too, working a different shift to Junie. Junie goes home in a bad mood, until he sees the love of his life, Liana (Aubrey Miles). After dinner, Junie is ready to sleep, to start a new job the next day. While working, Junie accidentally swallows a spider which has been exposed to a chemical spill, thus giving him web slinging abilities, and becoming Gagamboy.[1] After his shift, Dodoy comes in to work and leaves a sandwich unprotected. A cockroach exposed to the same spill as the spider slips into his sandwich, and as he eats it, he collapses, only to regain consciousness as a large cockroach. He hires two henchmen, and calls himself "Ipisman" (Cockroachman). Junie and Dodoy both try to win Liana's love. Dodoy practically gives up, only to return as Ipisman, to kidnap Liana to lure Gagamboy to his lair. There, he plans to finish off Gagamboy, but the tables turn and Dodoy is destroyed.

Characters introduced in Spider-Geddon
In Spider-Geddon, a multitude of new Spider-Men (and women) from throughout the multiverse are revealed.

Spider-Ben and Pete (Earth-91918)
In this universe, Peter and Ben Parker live together in a Latin and Spanish neighborhood and Ben is married to a Spanish Aunt May. When Ben got shot by a mugger, he had a blood transfusion with Peter and got his nephew's spider-powers. When Ben became a Spider-Man, he was a ruthless hero who once severely beat up Kraven the Hunter. He, alongside Peter, battled crime until May died from unknown causes.

Spider-Man (Norman Osborn) (Earth-44145)
On this universe, Norman Osborn is a six-armed version of Spider-Man. As Norman is informed of Harry moving through Oscorp and having been secretly armed, he is told that Harry is on the 15th floor near Mr. Warren's lab. Becoming Spider-Man and arriving where a warped Cosmic Cube is located, Norman confronts Harry, who dons the Kobold armor. It was revealed during the fight that Norman killed Peter Parker as Harry fired a laser beam at the warped Cosmic Cube. As Oscorp starts to disintegrate, Norman is pleased that Harry finally gave him what he wanted by accidentally giving Norman access to the multiverse. Just then, Spider-Punk arrives and pulls Norman out, much to his dismay. In the end of the event, after destroying the Web of Life along with Spiders-Man, he is seen holding a piece of the Web inside a container with an evil smile on his face. He returns targeting Octavius as the Superior Spider-Man, attempting to force Octavius to prove that he is still a villain by threatening to kill those close to Octavius unless Octavius kills three innocent people in the next few hours, but Octavius defeats him by making a deal with Mephisto to restore his original body and powers, banishing Osborn out of this reality.

Web-Slinger (Earth-31913)
In the universe based on the Old West, there is a cowboy version of Spider-Man called the Web-Slinger who rides a Spider-Horse and has six-gun web-shooters. He was first seen investigating Doc Morbius' bloodsucking rampage and child abductions. After Doc Morbius is defeated, the Web-Slinger is advised by Doc Morbius to rescue the children before the chemicals reach the flames. The Web-Slinger does so as Doc Morbius perishes in the explosion. The children then notice that the Web-Slinger's horse is wearing a mask and ask about it.

Spider-Byte (Earth-22191)
On this earth, an African-American girl named Margo is known as Spider-Byte in the virtual reality world. She is a genius student at the Peter Parker Memorial, Science & Technology. In this universe, the virtual reality world has become equal to the real world and she is the Spider-hero of that world. Spider-Byte is first seen stopping a virtual reality identity thief who robbed someone's online account. Afterwards, she goes to her class.

Savage Spider-Man (Earth-83043)
This alternate universe has a version of Spider-Man who lives in the Savage Land. When Peter and his family were flying inside a plane, the engine started burning and Peter's parents gave him the only parachute left in the plane to save him. Peter landed on the Savage Land, where he was raised by a tribe of giant spiders. The spiders made Peter to go under the Trial of 1,000 Venoms, where he was injected different venoms by the spiders to see if Peter would survive. He succeeded, and from the trial he got spider-powers as the Savage Spider-Man. Now with his powers, he protects the land from intruders like Wilson Fisk of the company Kingliner and Ka-Zar the Hunter when they are poaching dinosaurs. There was also a mentioning that Ka-Zar the Hunter's father killed the last of the Man-Things, as he unknowingly sets off one of the Savage Spider-Man's traps that nearly crushes Ka-Zar the Hunter. The Savage Spider-Man then confronts Wilson Fisk, who recognizes him as Peter Parker. A flashback in a discussion between Richard and Mary Parker and Wilson Fisk mentioned that Peter was supposed to stay with his aunt until something happened to his uncle. When Fisk's soldiers show up to attack, the giant spiders also arrive and attack the soldiers, while some of them follow Fisk onto his airplane. The Savage Spider-Man swings away as more giant spiders surround the airplane.

Spider-Kid (Earth-218)
Peter Parker in this universe, changed his name in Charlie Parker, because of the abuses of Uncle Ben and Aunt May. This also brings Charlie to become a problematic kid, spending two years at the Administration for Child Services and another two at Horizon Juvenile Detention Center. He becomes Spider-Kid at 13 years old and lives by himself.

Astro-Spider (Earth-3145)
John Jameson is the son of Jonah Jameson and an astronaut working for NASA. During a trip on a Space Shuttle, he gets bitten by a spider while being struck by cosmic waves and was forced to make an emergency landing, where he survives while his Earth is ravaged by a thermonuclear war. He then found himself having Spider-Man powers such as telekinetic webs in addition to telepathy. He is killed by Verna.

Spiders-Man (Earth-11580)
Spiders-Man is actually thousands of spiders working together as a hive mind that think they are Peter Parker. On this Earth when Peter Parker and Gwen Stacy visited Horizon Labs, he fell in a pit full of radioactive spiders which consumed him. His consciousness is absorbed into them. When the Goblin Nation (this team is composed of the Green Goblin, the Hobgoblin, the Demogoblin and Jack O'Lantern) arrives to kill Gwen Stacy, Spiders-Man saves her. After defeating the Goblins, they abandoned the costume.

Spiders-Man joins up with the Superior Spider-Man's group. He also assists Spider-Man of Earth-44145 in a secret plan to keep the Inheritors on Earth-616.

One of the spiders that makes up Spiders-Man of Earth-11580 later spies on the Superior Spider-Man on behalf of Spider-Man of Earth-44145. After being told the information he received from Spiders-Man of Earth-11580 after seeing Elliot Tolliver on his date with Emma Hernanfez, Spider-Man of Earth-44145 begins his revenge plans on the Superior Spider-Man.

The Spider (George Stacy) (Earth-91053)
On an unnamed Earth; George Stacy gained spider-powers, and wears a black homemade suit (with white stripes included in the upper part) as "The Spider". He saves Betty Brant from a female version of the Shocker.

Spider-Man (Harry Osborn) (Earth-3109)
During the return of the Inheritors, Spider-Gwen's device to travel through the multiverse got destroyed by Verna and then Gwen got stranded in an unidentified alternate universe. In this universe, Peter Parker and this universe's Gwen Stacy got a job at Oscorp and Peter wanted to create a cure for cancer after his Uncle Ben died from it. Peter was experimenting with spider venom to create the cure, but one of the spiders bit Harry Osborn, making Harry this universe's Spider-Man. Harry, alongside Gwen Stacy as this universe's Green Goblin, started to fight crime together until, during a fight with the Sandman, both Harry and Gwen's father got killed.

Spider-Cop (Earth-19119)
Spider-Cop is a version of Spider-Man who works for the New York Police Department in his reality. Described by Miles as a "grizzled veteran of the force," Spider-Cop wears a police uniform over his costume alongside a police cap, sunglasses, and a mustache over his mask. The Spider-Man of Earth-1048, who frequently assumes the persona of Spider-Cop in his own reality, is surprised that Spider-Cop actually exists. Spider-Cop later joins the other Spider-Totems summoned by the Spider-Man of Earth-616 and Spider-Gwen.

Spider-Man (Stan Lee)
From an unknown universe, a Stan Lee variation of Spider-Man exists. He appeared during the final battle of the Inheritors and when New U Technologies' cloning technology was used to revive the Inheritors as babies.

Characters introduced in End of Spider-Verse
The 2022 limited series Edge of Spider-Verse introduces yet another bevy of alternate universe versions of the character that play parts in the End of the Spider-Verse storyline.

Night-Spider (Earth-194)
An alternate version of Felicia Hardy who gained spider-powers after being bitten by the Delvadian Spider Idol statue that she stole. With her new abilities, she became Night-Spider

Spider-UK (Earth-834)
British teenager Zarina Zahari is secretly the second Spider-UK,  a superpowered agent of the Weird Happenings Organization (or W.H.O.) on her world. After saving London from a gigantic dragon, Zarina is recruited by Earth-616's Madame Web to help avert a crisis that threatens all of the spiders of the multiverse.

Spinstress (Earth-423)
On a fairy tale-inspired world, Princess Petra, a young royal who longs to escape the restrictive lifestyle imposed on her by her overprotective mother, Queen Mysteria. After being visited by her Fairy Gob-Mother, Petra is granted magical spider powers with the caveat that if she doesn't give them up by midnight, she'll lose her chance at true love. While attending a royal ball under the costumed identity of Spinstress, Petra is forced to keep her powers in order to battle her mother, secretly the villainess known as the Mysterious Empress. Despite missing her chance with James Watson, the boy she loves, Petra vows to use her powers to fight evil with her pet spider Webster.

Sun-Spider (Earth-20023)
Sun-Spider is Charolette "Charlie" Webber, a teenage girl who suffers from Ehlers-Danlos syndrome, which renders her unable to use her legs. Despite her disability, Charlie possesses the usual set of spider-powers, which allow her to traverse the city with ease. She's best friends with Glory Grant, Angelica Jones, and a girl named Aster, the last of whom she has a crush on (and is secretly the superheroine Histamina).

Hunter Spider (Earth-31)
An alternate version of Sergei Kravinoff who gained spider-powers after being bitten while fighting a giant spider during a safari in Zimbabwe. Taking on the costumed identity of Hunter Spider, Kravinoff hunted down and killed his world's versions of Spider-Man's various animal-themed adversaries, such as Black Cat, Vulture, Rhino, Stegron, Puma and White Rabbit, with their bodies kept as hunting trophies in his home.

Web-Weaver (Earth-71490)
Web-Weaver is Cooper Coen, a gay former classmate of Peter Parker who was bitten by the radioactive spider after pushing Peter out of the way. After being disowned by his homophobic parents, Cooper was taken in by his aunt Laurie and her wife Mel, whose kindness and civic mindedness inspired him to become a costumed hero. Balancing a double life as a superhero and a fashion designer working for Janet van Dyne, Cooper also has a crush on the vigilante Silk, who, unbeknownst to him, is secretly his ex-boyfriend Albert Moon.

Minor references
 In the "Age of Apocalypse", Peter Parker is executed by Apocalypse's regime simply because he is a potential ally for rebel Gwen Stacy.
 Peter Parker's counterpart on Counter-Earth is mentioned as having "died from radioactive over-exposure".
 In another alternate universe, Spider-Man is a cat who is known as Spider-Cat and fights a psychopathic pigeon named Venom.
 Spider-Man was depicted as one of many murder victims in Punisher Kills the Marvel Universe, Marvel Universe vs. the Punisher, Deadpool Kills the Marvel Universe, Deadpool Kills the Marvel Universe Again. and Edge of Venomverse
 In the Earth-691 continuity, Spider-Man is a time traveler who aids Killraven in fighting a second invasion by the Martians from H. G. Wells' The War of the Worlds, during which he is killed.
 In Contest of Champions, a version of Spider-Man is killed by Venom, who then wears his costume as a cape. Venom is then taunted by Spider-Man's voice until he himself is killed.
 In Old Man Logan, Spider-Man was killed during or sometime after the event where the villains rose to power and the heroes fell. In this timeline, he is implied to have married an unknown African-American woman and had a daughter, Tonya, who eventually married Hawkeye and had a child of their own, Ashley. Hawkeye won a poker game and customized the Spider-Mobile after his death.
 Deadpool encounters a version of Spider-Man in a universe which he refers to as "an Age of Apocalypse" (not the Age of Apocalypse). This alternative version of Spider-Man is Pestilence, a Horseman of Apocalypse. He has six arms, poisonous fangs, and engages in cannibalism.
 In the X-Men Forever universe after the X-Men have faked their deaths, Spider-Man runs into Rogue during a patrol, Rogue having recently unintentionally absorbed Nightcrawler's powers and appearance. Testing her new powers, Rogue spends the night fighting crime alongside Spider-Man, later suggesting that the two kiss to see how her recent transformation has affected her original abilities. After Spider-Man assists the X-Men in destroying a group of Sentinels, the X-Men return to the manor, Cyclops concluding that Spider-Man can be trusted to keep the secret of their continued survival.
 A monstrous version of Spider-Man was part of the Avengers of the Undead. This Spider-Man was later killed by Morlun.

In other media

There are many other versions of Spider-Man outside of comic books; some in film, in television or in video games, among countless other media. Some characters have crossed over in the comic book canon as one of the separate incarnations, such as the Ultimate Spider-Man animated series version and the live action Japanese show version appearing in "Spider-Verse". Also, one of the alternate Spider-Men from the series finale of the '90s TV show appeared in "Spider-Verse" as a background character, and the two live-action versions from the original trilogy and Amazing Spider-Man series are mentioned.

Japanese Spider-Man (Earth-51778)

Spider-Man (Earth-96283)

Sam Raimi's Spider-Man film trilogy

In the 2002–07 Spider-Man film trilogy, Peter Parker is portrayed by Tobey Maguire. This film trilogy portrays Peter gaining his abilities in his final days in high school and becoming a college student at Columbia University. While initially using his powers for selfish reasons, Peter is inspired by the death of his Uncle Ben to accept the responsibility that come with them, and begins fighting crime as Spider-Man. He navigates his relationships with his childhood crush-turned-friend and eventual girlfriend Mary Jane Watson, best friend Harry Osborn, his Aunt May, and his boss J. Jonah Jameson, while fighting adversaries such as the Green Goblin, Doctor Octopus, Sandman, Venom, and temporarily Harry as the New Goblin. Unlike most versions of Spider-Man, Maguire's iteration can shoot organic spider web from his wrists. He is also soft-spoken and is noted not to wisecrack as much as later cinematic portrayals of the character. Maguire's Parker / Spider-Man also appears in Spider-Man: The New Animated Series, voiced by Neil Patrick Harris, in addition to video games associated with this film trilogy.

Spider-Man (Earth-120703)

The Amazing Spider-Man film duology

The Spider-Man film series was rebooted after Spider-Man 3, with a new iteration of Peter Parker being portrayed by Andrew Garfield in The Amazing Spider-Man and its sequel. Peter is portrayed in these films as a quirky, angst-driven, and intelligent high school student whose parents Richard and Mary Parker were Oscorp scientists who disappeared and presumably died when Peter was young while attempting to prevent the company from exploiting their work for malevolent purposes. He also begins to date Gwen Stacy. Upon trying to learn about his parents' past from their colleague Dr. Curt Connors, Peter sneaks into Oscorp and is bitten by genetically modified spiders, gaining his abilities. He tracks down Connors and works with him to continue the work his father and Connors did, but inadvertently plays a part in Connors becoming the Lizard. Peter, who initially uses his powers in an attempt to track down his Uncle Ben's killer, is later inspired to protect New York City's residents as Spider-Man and thwart the Lizard's schemes. He later faces Electro and the Green Goblin, and temporarily gives up being a superhero after Gwen dies while assisting him against the two villains. Despite criticism of the films' convoluted plots, Garfield's portrayal of Parker / Spider-Man has received praise.

Spider-Man (MCU-Earth-616)

Marvel Cinematic Universe

In the Marvel Cinematic Universe (Earth-616), a much younger version of Peter Parker / Spider-Man is played by English actor Tom Holland. The origins of Holland's iteration of the character are not explored in-depth like Maguire and Garfield's portrayals, though he is recruited by Tony Stark / Iron Man into his faction of the Avengers during a dispute with Steve Rogers / Captain America. While continuing to work with Stark and the Avengers as an intern and gaining access to advanced technology for his suit, Peter also navigates high school life with his best friends Ned Leeds and Michelle "MJ" Jones, the latter of whom becomes his girlfriend. He joins the Avengers once more against Thanos in a universal conflict, and also fights against Vulture and Mysterio.

After The Amazing Spider-Man 2 failed to meet expectations, Sony Pictures and Marvel Studios negotiated a deal that would allow Spider-Man to join the Marvel Cinematic Universe, with a new iteration of the character created for the film franchise starting with Captain America: Civil War. While Marvel and its parent company Disney would gain distribution rights of Spider-Man's appearances in crossover films, Sony would continue to release Spider-Man's stand-alone films in the MCU, starting with Spider-Man: Homecoming.

Spider-Man (Earth-1048)

Insomniac's Peter Parker

The universe of Earth-1048 is the main setting for the Marvel's Spider-Man series and associated video games, developed by Insomniac Games and published by Sony Interactive Entertainment for PlayStation consoles and Microsoft Windows, introduced with Marvel's Spider-Man (2018). In this continuity, Peter Parker has been Spider-Man for eight years, and he and Mary Jane are no longer in a relationship. He does not work for The Daily Bugle anymore, but instead works as an assistant to Dr. Otto Octavius, who was Peter's idol and father figure until he sought revenge on Mayor Norman Osborn. Octavius releases the Devil's Breath Virus to tarnish Osborn's image, at the cost of many residents of New York City being infected, such as Peter's Aunt May. After a climactic battle against Doctor Octopus, Peter reclaims the cure to the Devil's Breath virus, but is unable to save May as the sample was needed to reproduce it, and May's condition had progressed to the point where she died before a cure could be mass-produced. May reveals that she knew about Peter's identity as Spider-Man. In Spider-Geddon, the Superior Spider-Man recruits Peter to fight the Inheritors after they defeated the Tarantula. In Marvel's Spider-Man: Miles Morales, after helping Miles stop Rhino, he leaves New York City under Morales' protection while on a journalistic excursion with Mary Jane Watson to cover a civil war in the nation of Symkaria for the Bugle but returns a few weeks later following Miles' battle with the Underground and Roxxon, deciding to trust Miles with being Spider-Man he temporarily retires from vigilante activities to focus on his personal life. He will return in Marvel’s Spider-Man 2 as one of the playable protagonists alongside Miles. He is voiced by Yuri Lowenthal.

Insomniac's Miles Morales

Miles Morales takes on the role of another featured Spider-Man within the Insomniac Games universe in the spin-off title, Marvel's Spider-Man: Miles Morales (2020) for PlayStation 4, PlayStation 5 and Microsoft Windows. He first appeared in Spider-Man (2018). A pre-spider bite Miles is playable at certain points in the game with an emphasis on stealth gameplay. This version was a fan of Spider-Man growing up and grew up with an affinity for science. His father was killed from an attack by Mister Negative. He is eventually bitten by an experimental Oscorp spider, and in a post-credits scene, reveals his powers to Peter, who in turn reveals his identity as Spider-Man. In the original game he was added as a younger character with whom younger audiences could identify when it was decided to use an older Peter Parker for the game. In Spider-Man: Miles Morales, Miles moves from Brooklyn to Harlem and is tasked with protecting the city while Peter is away on a business trip. He is forced to battle his childhood friend, Phin Mason, who has become a masked villain named the Tinkerer and leads a criminal group known as the Underground. Miles will return in Marvel’s Spider-Man 2 as one of the playable protagonists alongside Peter Parker. He is voiced by Nadji Jeter.

Spider-Man: Into the Spider-Verse
The 2018 animated film Spider-Man: Into the Spider-Verse adapts the "Spider-Verse" storyline and the Ultimate Spider-Man books starring Miles Morales. Variations of Miles Morales, Spider-Gwen, Spider-Ham, Spider-Noir, SP//dr, Spider-Man 2099, and the Spider-Man from the 1960s animated series (voiced by Shameik Moore, Hailee Steinfeld, John Mulaney, Nicolas Cage, Kimiko Glenn, Oscar Isaac, and Jorma Taccone, respectively) are featured.

The film also features two different versions of Peter Parker. The version in Miles' dimension has been Spider-Man for over 10 years, was married to Mary Jane Watson, and also had a secret underground lair in Aunt May's backyard that housed dozens of different Spider-Man costumes and gear. In the movie's first act, he is killed by the Kingpin while trying to stop the villain from using a particle accelerator to access other dimensions. His death inspires the recently bitten Miles Morales into carrying on his mission as the new Spider-Man and stopping the Kingpin from endangering the city. Unlike other versions, the Peter native to Miles' dimension had blonde hair. He was voiced by Chris Pine.

Spider-Man's exposure to the particle accelerator causes an alternate version of Peter Parker to get sucked into Miles' dimension. This version of Peter is in his 40s and has been Spider-Man for over 20 years. He was also married to Mary Jane Watson, but they divorced after he refused to have children with her. This, coupled with the death of his Aunt May, sent Peter's life into a downward spiral where he gave up being the wall-crawler, resulting in him getting lazier and overweight. He reluctantly agrees to mentor Miles on becoming the new Spider-Man to return to his home dimension, but later tries to prevent Miles from joining the other displaced Spider-Men when the young hero's inexperience begins to hold them back and volunteers to sacrifice himself so the other heroes can get home. Miles later joins them in the final fight against the Kingpin and his minions after he learns how to control his powers and instills new confidence in Peter that he will successfully defend his dimension. Thanks to his experience with Miles and a run-in with an alternate version of his ex, Peter decides to give his relationship with Mary Jane another shot. He was voiced by Jake Johnson.

References

 
Articles about multiple fictional characters
Fictional characters from parallel universes